Rio do Prado is a municipality in the northeast of the Brazilian state of Minas Gerais.  Its population in 2020 was 5,133 inhabitants in a total area of 479 km².  

Rio do Prado belongs to the  Almenara statistical microregion.  The elevation of the municipal seat is 350 meters.  It became a municipality in 1953.  This municipality is located in the valley of the Rubim do Sul River, a tributary of the Jequitinhonha River.
Neighboring municipalities are: Palmópolis, Rubim, Bertópolis, and Felisburgo.

The main economic activities are cattle raising, and subsistence farming.  The GDP was R$15,723,000 (2005).  There were no banking agencies in 2006.  There were 113 automobiles in 2007.  The main cash crop was coffee.  In the health sector there were 04 health clinics.  The score on the Municipal Human Development Index was 0.626 (medium).  This ranked Rio do Prado 793 out of 853 municipalities in the state, with Poços de Caldas in first place with 0.841 and Setubinha in last place with 0.568. See Frigoletto for the complete list. 
In October 2010 Celio Vieira de Oliveira created the first entertainment site in the city of Rio do Prado, MG http://riodoprado.com/ (www.RioDoPrado.com)
Listen
Read phonetically
Dictionary - View detailed dictionary

References

Statistics from IBGE
Citybrazil
Frigoletto

See also
 List of municipalities in Minas Gerais

Municipalities in Minas Gerais